The 2012 Pittsburgh Steelers season was the franchise's 80th season as a member of the National Football League (NFL). It was the 13th season under the leadership of general manager Kevin Colbert and the 6th under head coach Mike Tomlin. The Steelers failed to improve on their 12–4 record from 2011 and did not reach the postseason for the first time since 2009. After a 6–3 start, the Steelers lost 5 of their last 7 games and finished the season with a record of 8–8, their first non-winning season since 2006. The 2012 Steelers set a new NFL record for the most games decided on the last play, with 6. For the first time since 1997, Hines Ward was not on the team's roster, as he was released in March 2012. Ward retired after he was cut.

Staff

Roster

2012 draft class

 Note: Pick from Raiders through the Washington Redskins (The Steelers traded selections 119 and 193 to the Redskins for selection 109).
 Note: All three of these selections are compensatory selections.

Schedule

Preseason

Regular season

Note: Intra-division opponents are in bold text.

Game summaries

Week 1: at Denver Broncos

The Pittsburgh Steelers opened their 2012 season facing the Denver Broncos, the team that had stunned them in the AFC Wildcard Playoffs to end their 2011 season.  The game was even more important, as it was former Indianapolis Colts quarterback Peyton Manning's first game with the Broncos, and his first since recovering from neck surgery following the 2010 season.  The Steelers were playing their first game with new offensive coordinator Todd Haley, but were missing long-time team leaders Hines Ward and James Farrior.  The first quarter of the game featured multiple punts by both teams, as neither offense could establish any consistency in moving the football.  The Steelers scored first, scoring on a 21-yard field goal to take a 3–0 lead early in the second quarter.  The Broncos would respond by going no-huddle and scoring the game's first touchdown on a 7-yard run by Knowshon Moreno.  The Steelers would end the first half scoring on a 4-yard touchdown pass from Ben Roethlisberger to Heath Miller, giving them a 10–7 lead.  The Steelers would begin the third quarter by methodically driving the offense down the field and kicking a 35-yard field goal, capping off a drive that kept Manning and the Broncos offense on the sideline for nearly 10-minutes.  However, it would only take Manning 36-seconds to put the Broncos back on top 14–13, when a short screen pass to Demaryius Thomas resulted in a 71-yard touchdown.  The Steelers would put the first points of the fourth quarter on the board, when Roethlisberger found Mike Wallace for a 3-yard touchdown pass.  The Steelers would fail to convert on their 2-point conversion attempt, leading 19–14.  The Broncos would once again go no-huddle and score on a 1-yard pass to Jacob Tamme, and also convert a two-point attempt, giving the Broncos back the lead, 22–19.  After a 26-yard field goal with only 3-minutes remaining in the game, The Steelers were given one more chance to come back and win.  However, a Roethlisberger pass would be intercepted and returned 43-yards for a touchdown, sealing the Broncos win over the Steelers 31–19 as the team began their season 0–1 for the 2nd straight year.

Week 2: vs. New York Jets

The Pittsburgh Steelers began week two looking to avoid a 0–2 start to their season.  They would move the ball down the field on their opening possession, but could only come away with 3-points.  The New York Jets responded by scoring the game's first touchdown, and would lead 7–3 at the end of the first quarter.  The Steelers would score off another field goal early in the second quarter and a one-yard pass late in the second quarter to lead 13–10 at halftime.  The Steelers would come out after halftime and quickly take control of the game, scoring on a 37-yard touchdown pass from Ben Roethlisberger to Mike Wallace.  The Steelers defense dominated the Jets offense, completely shutting down Jets quarterback Mark Sanchez and his receivers.  The Steelers would score one more touchdown late in the fourth quarter to give them a 27–10 victory and move them to 1–1 in the standings.

Week 3: at Oakland Raiders

The Pittsburgh Steelers headed to Oakland, CA in week three to take on their long-time rivals.  The Steelers would score first on a 4-yard touchdown pass from Ben Roethlisberger to tight end Heath Miller, but the Raiders would respond when running back Darren McFadden would break loose on a run and take it 64-yards for a touchdown.  Heath Miller would catch another 4-yard touchdown pass, and the Raiders would once again respond with a 3-yard touchdown pass from Carson Palmer to Darrius Heyward-Bey.  The Steelers would kick a 33-yard field goal as time expired in the first half to give them a 17–14 lead.  The Steelers would begin the second half by driving down the field and scoring on a 22-yard touchdown pass to Mike Wallace.  But the Raiders would yet again respond with a 1-yard touchdown pass to Richard Gordon.  The Steelers would again drive down the field easily, but Antonio Brown would fumble the football in the endzone.  After review, it was determined that Brown had recovered his own fumble and the Steelers found themselves leading the game 31–21 with 1:31 left in the third quarter.  Early in the fourth quarter, Pittsburgh safety Ryan Mundy, playing for the injured Troy Polamalu, committed a helmet-to-helmet hit on Oakland receiver Heyward-Bey.  The hit knocked Heyward-Bey unconscious and he was taken to the hospital with a concussion and sprained neck.  (Mundy was not flagged for the illegal hit by the replacement referees, but would be fined by the NFL a few days later.)  The Steelers secondary issues from the past few years continued, as they could not stop Carson Palmer and the Raiders passing attack.  The Raiders would score on a 6-yard touchdown pass and a 32-yard field goal to tie the game at 31.  The Steelers had a chance to win the game late in the fourth quarter, but the Raiders defense held them to a 3-and-out and forced them to punt the ball back.  Palmer would again exploit Pittsburgh's suspect secondary and kicker Janikowski would kick a 43-yard field goal as time expired to give the Raiders a 34–31 victory over the Steelers, their first of the season.  The Steelers would head into their bye-week 1–2, and eventually ended up being the only AFC North team to lose to the Raiders.

Week 5: vs. Philadelphia Eagles

After a scoreless first quarter, the Steelers drew first blood as Ben Roethlisberger connected with Rashard Mendenhall for a 13-yard catch for a TD to take a 7–0 lead.  With 0:06 left in the first half, the Steelers increased their lead to 10–0 with a 20-yard field goal from Shaun Suisham going into halftime.  In the 3rd quarter, the Eagles responded with Michael Vick's TD pass to WR LeSean McCoy to shorten the lead 10–7 for the only score of that quarter.  The Steelers responded in the 4th quarter with Shaun Suisham kicking a 34-yard field goal to make the score 13–7.  The Eagles however took the lead with Vick hooking up with Brent Celek for a 2-yard TD pass as the Eagles moved ahead 14–13.  However, the Steelers were able to move down the field in the final seconds and capitalize their victory with another 34-yard field goal from Shaun Suisham as they went on to win the game 16–14.

With the win, the Steelers improved to 2–2.  They would also increase their record at home to 2–0.

Week 6: at Tennessee Titans

Still hungry for their first road win of the season, the Steelers traveled to LP Field to take on longtime and former divisional rivals the Tennessee Titans.  Scoring began early in the first quarter as the Titans took a 3–0 lead after Rob Bironas's 22-yard field goal.  The Steelers responded with Suisham's 29-yard field goal to tie the game 3–3.  The Steelers took the lead after Roethlisberger connected with Mike Wallace for an 82-yard touchdown pass to take a 10–3 lead.  The Titans drew closer with Bironas's 38-yard field goal to shorten the lead 10–6.  In the 2nd quarter, the Titans retook the lead with Jamie Harper's 1-yard touchdown run to make the score 13–10.  They would increase their lead with yet another Bironas field goal from 47 yards out to increase their lead 16–10 at halftime.  The Steelers moved down the field in spite of a 28-yard field goal to make the score 16–13 for the only score of the 3rd quarter.  In the fourth quarter, the Steelers retook the lead with Baron Batch's 1-yard TD run to make the score 20–16 and then increased their lead with Suisham's 52-yard field goal for a 23–16 lead.  After thinking all was lost, the Titans drove down the field for a comeback attempt.  Matt Hasselbeck threw a 5-yard touchdown pass to Kenny Britt to tie the game at 23–23.  After Suisham missed a game-winning 54-yard field goal, the Titans again drove down the field and ended the game with Bironas's 40-yard field goal to make the final score 26–23.  The loss to the Titans was the first for the Steelers since their 31–14 loss against them in 2008 which was also in Tennessee.  The Steelers fell back under .500 and sat at 2–3 and 3rd place in the AFC North while sitting at 0–3 in road games during this point of the season.

Week 7: at Cincinnati Bengals

Looking for their first road win of the season the Steelers traveled to Paul Brown Stadium to take on their division rivals Bengals.  In the first quarter, the Steelers would score first with Shaun Suisham kicking a 42-yard field goal to make it 3–0.  The Bengals responded with Cedric Peerman's 5-yard run for a TD to make it 7–3 as the Bengals took the lead.  In the second quarter, the Bengals increased their lead as Andy Dalton connected with A. J. Green on an 8-yard TD pass to make it 14–3.  The Steelers responded with a 47-yard field goal from Suisham to make the score 14–6.  After an interception from Andy Dalton, the Steelers moved down the field as Ben Roethlisberger connected with Heath Miller for a TD pass with the 2-point conversion successful, the score was tied 14–14 at halftime.  After the break, the Bengals score first in the 3rd quarter after Mike Nugent kicked a 48-yard field goal for them to take the lead 17–14.  The Steelers however tied the game back up with Suisham kicking a 47-yard field goal.  In the fourth quarter, the Steelers would retake the lead with RB Chris Rainey running into the end zone for an 11-yard TD to move ahead 24–17.  After consecutive 3 and outs by the Bengals, the Steelers would run the clock out after the 2-minute warning giving them the victory.

With their 5th straight win over the Bengals, the Steelers improved to 3–3 and have yet to be above .500 for the season.  Also, the team improved to 1–3 in road games and 11–2 at Paul Brown Stadium.

Week 8: vs. Washington Redskins

The Steelers returned home to take on the Redskins.  Scoring began early in the game as the Steelers would score on Roethlisberger's 1-yard pass to Leonard Pope to take a 7–0 lead.  Shaun Suisham then kicked a 48-yard field goal to make it 10–0.  In the 2nd quarter, the Redskins got on the board as RG3 found Santana Moss for a 2-yard TD pass (with a blocked PAT) and the score was left at 10–6.  The Steelers did not hesitate, however, as they pushed ahead by double digits as Ben Roethlisberger connected with Heath Miller for a 7-yard pass to make the score 17–6.  Suisham increased their lead with a 27-yard field goal as the team lead 20–6 at halftime.  Coming into the 3rd quarter, the Redskins scored first with a 48-yard field goal from Kai Forbath to make the score 20–9.  However, the Steelers responded with Roethlisberger connecting with Will Johnson for a 1-Yard TD pass to make the score 27–9.  In the fourth quarter, the Redskins tried to rally a comeback as Forbath kicked a 45-yard field goal to make the score 27–12.  They would then be kept from scoring any more points for the remainder of the game by the Steelers' defense.

With the win, the Steelers improved to over .500 and outright second place in the AFC North at 4–3 and also 3–0 during home games.

Week 9: at New York Giants

Due to Hurricane Sandy's aftermath, the Steelers flew to New Jersey on game day because the team was unable to find a hotel in New York.

After a scoreless first quarter punt fest, the Steelers drew first blood with Ben Roethlisberger's 4-yard TD pass to Emmanuel Sanders for a 7–0 lead.  The Giants however responded to tie the game with RB Andre Brown's 1-Yard Run to make it 7–7.  After recovering a fumble, the Giants would take the lead as Michael Boley returned it 70 yards for a TD to move ahead 14–7.  The Steelers would shorten the lead to 4 with Shaun Suisham's 30-yard field goal to make the score 14–10 at halftime.

After the break, the Giants would increase their lead from 7 to 10 points with 2 Lawrence Tynes field goals from 50 and 23 yards out making the score at first 17–10 then 20–10.  However, the Steelers responded in the 4th quarter with Roethlisberger finding Mike Wallace for a 51-yard catch and run pass to shorten the Giants' lead to 3 making it 20–17.  After pressuring Eli and the Giants' offense, the Steelers then drove down the field and took the lead with Redman's 2-Yard Run to make it 24–20.  Getting the ball back after the Giants' last 3 and out, Roethlisberger took a knee to end the game as the team improved to 5–3, snapping the Giants' 4-game winning streak.  Also, the Steelers would improve to 2–3 in road games and 3–0 against the NFC East.

Week 10: vs. Kansas City Chiefs

After a tough road win over the Giants, the Steelers returned home for a game against the Chiefs.  With the win, the Steelers improved to 6–3 and also 4–0 in home games and 1–2 against the AFC West.  However, Roethlisberger would be knocked out of the game in the 3rd quarter with a shoulder injury and was reported to be out for following week's home game against the AFC North-leading Baltimore Ravens.

Week 11: vs. Baltimore Ravens

With their 3rd straight loss to the Ravens, the Steelers dropped to 6–4 and 2 games behind them in the AFC North.  They are also now 1–1 in division games and 4–1 at home.

Week 12: at Cleveland Browns

By losing their first game to the Cleveland Browns in three years, the Steelers fall to 6–5 on the season, 1–2 against division rivals, 2–4 on the road, and 11–3 at Cleveland Browns Stadium. This is only the third time Pittsburgh has lost a game in Ohio ever since their quarterback Ben Roethlisberger, an Ohio native who was sitting out of the game due to injury, was drafted by them in 2004.  Also, Mike Tomlin's record against the Browns all-time would drop to 9–2. The Browns would eventually become the only division rival whom the Steelers would lose to on the road during the season, after winning in Cincinnati on Sunday Night Football and before winning in Baltimore the next week; the 2000 season was the last time these three events occurred together.

Week 13: at Baltimore Ravens

Coming off an 8 turnover performance against the Browns, the Steelers looked to avoid a three-game losing streak. Pittsburgh 3rd-string quarterback, Charlie Batch led the Steelers a 3–0 lead for the first quarter and then after 13 unanswered points by the Ravens, the Steelers outscored the Ravens 20–7 through the rest of the game, giving them a 23–20 victory over the Ravens. This was the Steelers' first win against the Ravens since the 2010–2011 season.

Week 14: vs. San Diego Chargers

With the loss the Steelers dropped to 7–6 overall, 4–2 in home games, 1–3 against the AFC West, and 14–1 all-time at home against the San Diego Chargers despite Big Ben returning to the field from injury. The win for San Diego was the first regular season road victory in Pittsburgh in franchise history.  They became the only AFC North team to lose to the Chargers, win less than three games against all four AFC West teams, and not win any of those matchups in regulation.

With losses by the Ravens and Bengals on the same day, the AFC North title remains in sight for Pittsburgh, who will travel to Dallas next week to take on the Cowboys, a team they have faced three times out of their eight appearances in the Super Bowl. Both teams share the NFL-record number of Super Bowl appearances for a franchise, tied at eight, and remain the only two teams to face each other more than twice in Super Bowl matchups.

Week 15: at Dallas Cowboys

Ben Roethlisberger threw an interception during their second play of overtime, handing the win to Dallas.  With the overtime loss, the Steelers enabled the arch-rival Ravens (9–5) to secure their fifth consecutive playoff berth by dropping to 7–7 on the season, thus moving them down to third place in the AFC North with their playoff hopes in jeopardy. Pittsburgh also finished their regular season at 3–5 in road games after dropping to 0–2 at Cowboys Stadium (the other loss there was to the Packers in Super Bowl XLV).

The Steelers hope to rebound at home against the second-place Bengals (8–6) next week in what is a must-win game for both AFC North rivals, as only one of them will be able to join Baltimore in the playoffs, unless the Indianapolis Colts lose their final two games or the Miami Dolphins lose at least one of their final two games. It will be the fourth straight week in which the Steelers will be featured on NFL on CBS's marquee game.

Week 16: vs. Cincinnati Bengals

Quarterback Ben Roethlisberger, for the second week in a row, would throw a costly interception with a chance to win the game.  With the loss, the Steelers not only fell to 7–8, but have also been eliminated from the playoff race for the first time since 2009 and faced their first non-winning season since 2006. It is also worth noting that the Steelers have missed the playoffs whenever they lost at least one game to Cincinnati during a given season from 2006 to 2012.

Pittsburgh hopes to avoid getting swept by the Browns for the first time since 1988 during their home finale in Week 17, and facing their first losing season since 2003, which was also the last time the Browns have won a game in Pittsburgh. By virtue of the Browns' loss later that afternoon in Denver, the Steelers are assured of third place in the AFC North for the season.

Week 17: vs. Cleveland Browns

After losing to the Bengals, the Steelers stayed home for a regular season finale against the 5–10 Browns.  After a scoreless first quarter, the Steelers would draw first blood moving ahead 3–0 off of a Shaun Suisham 41-yard field goal.  However, the Browns managed to tie it up with Phil Dawson's 51-yard field goal at 3–3.  The Steelers pulled away not long before halftime with Roethlisberger's 1-yard touchdown pass to Leonard Pope to take a 10–3 lead at halftime.  After the break, Browns 3rd string QB Thaddeus Lewis to WR Greg Little to tie the game 10–10.  However, the Steelers responded with Roethlisberger's 9-yard touchdown pass to WR Antonio Brown to move ahead 17–10.  In the fourth quarter, the Steelers would increase their lead with Roethlisberger's 12-yard touchdown pass to WR Plaxico Burress to make it 24–10.  The defense shut down the Browns' offense and therefore the team saved their season and finished 8–8, avoiding a losing season for the first time since 2003.

During the game, the Steelers' defense forced 4 turnovers (1 interception, 3 lost fumbles) in retaliation for their 8 turnovers during their 20–14 loss at Cleveland when the Browns' defense got 3 interceptions and 5 lost fumbles.  This brings the Steelers' yearly total of turnovers against the Browns to 5 in both games (2 interceptions, 3 lost fumbles). Heinz Field's turnout of 51,831 fans was the smallest for a Steelers game since their current stadium's opening in 2001.

Standings

Transactions
On February 7, 2012, the Pittsburgh Steelers named Todd Haley as offensive coordinator.
On February 8, 2012, the Pittsburgh Steelers signed free agents (WR) Juamorris Stewart and (OLB) Brandon Hicks.
On February 29, 2012, the Pittsburgh Steelers released (WR) Hines Ward.
On March 2, 2012, the Pittsburgh Steelers released (DE) Aaron Smith and (ILB) James Farrior.
On March 3, 2012, the Pittsburgh Steelers released (G) Chris Kemoeatu.
On March 12, 2012, the Pittsburgh Steelers tendered offers to (WR) Mike Wallace, (CB) Keenan Lewis, (FS) Ryan Mundy, (TE) David Johnson, (C) Doug Legursky and (G) Ramon Foster.
On March 21, 2012, the Pittsburgh Steelers signed free agents (WR) Wes Lyons and (FB) Will Johnson.
On April 10, 2012, the Pittsburgh Steelers signed unrestricted free agent (TE) Leonard Pope to a 1-year contract.
On April 12, 2012, the Pittsburgh Steelers re-signed unrestricted free agent (G) Trai Essex to a 1-year contract.
On April 16, 2012, the Pittsburgh Steelers re-signed unrestricted free agent (QB) Charlie Batch to a 1-year contract.
On April 26, 2012, the Pittsburgh Steelers re-signed unrestricted free agent (QB) Byron Leftwich to a 1-year contract.
On May 2, 2012, the Pittsburgh Steelers released (CB) Antonio Smith and (RB) Chad Spann.
On May 6, 2012, the Pittsburgh Steelers signed fourth round pick (NT) Alameda Ta'amu and fifth round pick (RB) Chris Rainey to 4-year contracts.
On May 8, 2012, the Pittsburgh Steelers signed seventh round pick (WR) Toney Clemons to a 4-year contract.
On May 9, 2012, the Pittsburgh Steelers signed second round draft pick (T) Mike Adams and seventh round draft picks (TE) David Paulson and (CB) Terrence Frederick to 4-year contracts.
On May 10, 2012, the Pittsburgh Steelers signed seventh round draft pick (T) Kelvin Beachum to a 4-year contract.
On May 29, 2012, the Pittsburgh Steelers signed third round draft pick (ILB) Sean Spence to a 4-year contract.
On May 30, 2012, the Pittsburgh Steelers signed free agent (QB) Kordell Stewart to a 1-day contract and announced his retirement.
On June 13, 2012, the Pittsburgh Steelers signed unrestricted free agents (ILB) Brandon Johnson and (LS) Matt Katula.
On July 17, 2012, the Pittsburgh Steelers re-signed free agent (T) Max Starks to a 1-year contract.
On July 19, 2012, the Pittsburgh Steelers released (T) Jonathan Scott.
On July 23, 2012, the Pittsburgh Steelers signed undrafted free agent (T) Bridger Buche to a 1-year contract.
On July 24, 2012, the Pittsburgh Steelers re-signed Mike Tomlin to a 3-year contract extension (5-year contract) through the 2016 season.
On July 24, 2012, the Pittsburgh Steelers signed first round pick (G) David DeCastro to a 4-year contract.
On July 27, 2012, the Pittsburgh Steelers re-signed (WR) Antonio Brown to a 5-year contract extension through 2017.
On July 31, 2012, the Pittsburgh Steelers signed undrafted free agent (WR) Paul Cox to a 1-year contract and released (T) Bridger Buche.
On August 3, 2012, the Pittsburgh Steelers signed free agent (CB) Josh Victorian to a 1-year contract and placed (CB) Terry Carter on the Waived/Injured List.
On August 23, 2012, the Pittsburgh Steelers fired special teams coordinator Al Everest.
On August 27, 2012, the Pittsburgh Steelers released (ILB) Ryan Baker, (NT) Mike Blanc, (WR) Paul Cox, (CB) Andre Freeman, (K) Daniel Hrapmann, (OLB) Mortty Ivy (Waived/Injured List), (T) Kyle Jolly, (LS) Matt Katula, (TE) Jamie McCoy, (CB) Walter McFadden, (TE) Justin Peelle, (FS) Myron Rolle, (WR) Juamorris Stewart, (NT) Kade Weston and (WR) Jimmy Young.
On August 27, 2012, the Pittsburgh Steelers claimed (RB) DuJuan Harris off of waivers from the Jacksonville Jaguars.
On August 28, 2012, the Pittsburgh Steelers re-signed restricted free agent (WR) Mike Wallace to a 1-year contract and released (RB) Jason Ford.
On August 31, 2012, the Pittsburgh Steelers released (WR) Tyler Beiler, (NT) Corbin Bryant, (WR) Toney Clemons, (G) Trai Essex, (CB) Terrence Frederick, (WR) David Gilreath, (RB) DuJuan Harris, (OLB) Brandon Hicks, (DE) Ikponmwosa Igbinosun, (QB) Jerrod Johnson, (P) Jeremy Kapinos (Waived/Injured List), (G) Ryan Lee, (G) John Malecki, (WR) Marquis Maze, (ILB) Marshall McFadden, (T) Chris Scott, (SS) Da'Mon Cromartie-Smith, (DE) Jake Stoller, (CB) Josh Victorian and (WR) Derrick Williams.
On September 1, 2012, the Pittsburgh Steelers agreed to terms with (WR) Toney Clemons, (WR) David Gilreath, (G) Ryan Lee, (G) John Malecki, (TE) Jamie McCoy, (ILB) Marshall McFadden, (SS) Da'Mon Cromartie-Smith and (CB) Josh Victorian for practice squad.
On September 7, 2012, the Pittsburgh Steelers signed free agent (CB) DeMarcus Van Dyke to a 1-year contract.
On October 16, 2012, the Pittsburgh Steelers signed (NT) Corbin Bryant to the active roster, signed (G) Jacques McClendon to the practice squad and released (TE) Jamie McCoy.
On October 16, 2012, the Pittsburgh Steelers suspended (NT) Alameda Ta'amu for two games.
On October 20, 2012, the Pittsburgh Steelers promoted (G) John Malecki to the active roster and released (NT) Corbin Bryant.
On October 27, 2012, the Pittsburgh Steelers promoted (SS) Da'Mon Cromartie-Smith to the active roster and released (G) John Malecki.
On October 29, 2012, the Pittsburgh Steelers reinstated (NT) Alameda Ta'amu.
On October 31, 2012, the Pittsburgh Steelers released (SS) Da'Mon Cromartie-Smith.
On November 12, 2012, the Pittsburgh Steelers promoted (WR) David Gilreath to the active roster and released (NT) Alameda Ta'amu.
On November 15, 2012, the Pittsburgh Steelers promoted (ILB) Marshall McFadden to the active roster and signed (TE) Jamie McCoy to the practice squad.
On November 20, 2012, the Pittsburgh Steelers signed unrestricted free agent (WR) Plaxico Burress and free agent (QB) Brian Hoyer to 1-year contracts and also released (RB) Baron Batch and (ILB) Marshall McFadden.
On November 26, 2012, the Pittsburgh Steelers promoted (G) John Malecki to the active roster and released (WR) David Gilreath.
On December 8, 2012, the Pittsburgh Steelers promoted (CB) Josh Victorian to the active roster and released (QB) Brian Hoyer.
On December 11, 2012, the Pittsburgh Steelers suspended (RB) Rashard Mendenhall for one game for conduct detrimental to the team and promoted (RB) Baron Batch to the active roster.

References

External links 
 2012 Pittsburgh Steelers season at Pro Football Reference 
 2012 Pittsburgh Steelers season statistics at jt-sw.com 

Pittsburgh Steelers
Pittsburgh Steelers seasons
2012 in sports in Pennsylvania
2010s in Pittsburgh